The lowland beaked blind snake (Gerrhopilus depressiceps) is a species of snake in the Gerrhopilidae family.

References

Gerrhopilus
Taxa named by Richard Sternfeld
Reptiles described in 1913